Sporormia is a genus of fungi in the family Sporormiaceae.

References

Pleosporales
Taxa named by Giuseppe De Notaris